The 3rd Arizona State Legislature, consisting of the Arizona State Senate and the Arizona House of Representatives, was constituted from January 1, 1917, to December 31, 1918, during the first term of Thomas Edward Campbell, which was contested, and he left office after serving less than a year (January 1 – December 25, 1917) and the third term of George W. P. Hunt as Governor of Arizona, in Phoenix.  The number of senators and representatives remained constant at 19 and 35, respectively.  The Republicans made modest gains in both houses, gaining 4 seats in both the Senate and the House, leaving Democrats with a 14–5 majority in the Senate and 31–4 majority in the House.

Sessions
The Legislature met for the regular session at the State Capitol in Phoenix on January 8, 1917; and adjourned on March 8.  With the entrance of the United States into World War I, a special session was called to deal with the issues confronting Arizona in the U.S.'s prosecution of the war.  It convened May 21, 1918 and lasted until June 19.

State Senate

Members
The asterisk (*) denotes members of the previous Legislature who continued in office as members of this Legislature.

House of Representatives

Members
The asterisk (*) denotes members of the previous Legislature who continued in office as members of this Legislature.

References

Arizona legislative sessions
1917 in Arizona
1918 in Arizona
1917 U.S. legislative sessions
1918 U.S. legislative sessions